David Hossein Safavian (born August 4, 1967) is an American former lawyer who worked as a congressional aide, lobbyist, and later as a political appointee in the George W. Bush administration. A Republican, he served as Chief of Staff of the United States General Services Administration (GSA). He is a figure in the Jack Abramoff lobbying and corruption scandal, having worked with the lobbyist on the Mississippi Band of Choctaw account. After serving with Abramoff as a lobbyist, in 1997 Safavian co-founded lobbying firm Janus-Merritt Strategies with Republican activist Grover Norquist.

In 2004, Safavian was serving as Administrator for Federal Procurement Policy, Office of Management and Budget, when he was arrested and charged with crimes in connection with the Abramoff corruption scandal. He was convicted on four of five charges on October 27, 2006, and sentenced to 18 months in prison. However, on June 17, 2008, the United States Court of Appeals for the District of Columbia Circuit unanimously reversed Safavian's convictions based on trial errors, and ordered a new trial. On December 19, 2008, at his retrial, Safavian was convicted again of perjury. He was sentenced to a year in prison. On June 26, 2017, Safavian was disbarred from the practice of law in the Supreme Court of the United States. He was pardoned by President Donald Trump on February 18, 2020.

Early life and education
Safavian was born into an Iranian-American family in Grosse Ile, Michigan. He attended private schools and graduated fifth in his class at Detroit College of Law. He also studied at Loyola University Maryland, Georgetown University Law Center, Michigan State University College of Law, and Saint Louis University.

Career
In 1997, Safavian and Grover Norquist founded a lobbying firm, the Merritt Group, which they renamed as Janus-Merritt Strategies (it is sometimes referred to as "Janus Merritt" or simply "Janus"). The firm promoted Republican ideology. "We represent clients who really do have an interest in a smaller federal government," Safavian told Legal Times in a 1997 interview. "We're all very ideologically driven, and have a bias in favor of free markets." He continued: "We're not letting people who offer us money change our principles."

The firm's clients included businesses such as BP America, the U.S. division of British Petroleum. They also had foreign clients, such as the Corporacion Venezolana de Cementos and Grupo Financiero Banorte.  They represented the National Indian Gaming Commission and Indian tribes working on gaming, such as the Saginaw Chippewa, a client the firm shared with Jack Abramoff, and the Viejas band of Kumeyaay Indians.

In 1999, Safavian founded the Internet Consumer Choice Coalition, a non-profit organized to oppose a bill to make online gambling a federal crime; the bill was drafted by Republican Arizona US Senator Jon Kyl. Coalition members included the American Civil Liberties Union, the Association of Concerned Taxpayers, Citizens for a Sound Economy, the Competitive Enterprise Institute, the Interactive Services Association, the Small Business Survival Committee, and the United States Internet Council. Some coalition members—the Interactive Services Association, for one—were also independent clients of Safavian. Americans for Tax Reform, another member, was the activist group led by Norquist. An October 12, 2006, Senate Finance Committee report concluded that most of these organizations abused their tax-exempt status through participation in such lobbying through the Coalition.

Also listed as a client was Abdul Rahman al-Amoudi, a Muslim activist and supporter of Hamas and Hezbollah who was later arrested for conspiring with the Libyan government. Questioned on this in 2004, Safavian claimed this was a mistake, and their client was actually Jamal al Barzinji, whose name had replaced al-Amoudi's on lobbying disclosure forms in 2001.

Federal positions
In early 2002, Safavian began looking for a new job.  On February 4, 2002, he sent lobbyist Jack Abramoff his resume, receiving a very positive response five days later.  In mid-April, Safavian interviewed at Greenberg Traurig, the firm that employed Abramoff. Soon after that he was offered a political appointee position at the U.S. General Services Administration (GSA), the business arm of the government. On April 30, he wrote to Abramoff: "my gut is telling me to take the GSA job before joining up with you and your band of merry men."

On May 16, 2002, GSA Administrator Stephen A. Perry named Safavian as Senior Advisor and Acting Deputy Chief of Staff at the GSA.

On November 4, 2003, President George W. Bush announced Safavian's nomination as Administrator for Federal Procurement Policy, Office of Management and Budget, Executive Office of the President. He had the responsibility to set purchasing policy for the entire government.

Prosecution and pardon

Safavian was indicted October 5, 2005.  He was accused of making false statements and obstructing investigations into his dealings with Jack Abramoff while serving as chief of staff for the General Services Administration. His trial started May 25, 2006. He was convicted on four of five felony counts of lying and obstruction on June 20.
Because Safavian's defense was unfairly limited, the court overturned all four convictions. Double jeopardy was applied to at least one charge and an additional specification. This left only three of the original five charges for which the prosecution could retry Safavian.

Safavian was retried and convicted of perjury. On October 16, 2009 he was sentenced to a year in prison for lying about his association with Jack Abramoff by U.S. District Judge Paul L. Friedman. Friedman deferred the prison reporting date to allow Safavian to be with his pregnant wife when she delivered their child.

On February 18, 2020 President Trump granted Safavian a Presidential Pardon along with several other convicted criminals.

See also
Jack Abramoff Indian lobbying scandal
List of positions filled by presidential appointment with Senate confirmation

References

Living people
American perjurers
American lawyers
Political chiefs of staff
Saint Louis University alumni
Detroit College of Law alumni
George W. Bush administration personnel
General Services Administration officials
1967 births
Politicians from Detroit
United States congressional aides
People convicted of making false statements
Michigan Republicans
American politicians of Iranian descent
Michigan politicians convicted of crimes
People from Grosse Ile, Michigan
Recipients of American presidential pardons